The Flash is an American superhero television series developed for The CW by Greg Berlanti, Andrew Kreisberg, and Geoff Johns, based on the DC Comics character Barry Allen / Flash. It is set in the Arrowverse, sharing continuity with the other television series of the franchise, and is a spin-off of Arrow. The series premiered on October 7, 2014, and has been renewed through its seventh season. Grant Gustin stars as Barry, a crime scene investigator who gains superhuman speed, which he uses to fight criminals, including others who have also gained superhuman abilities.

The series has been a candidate for television awards in a variety of categories recognizing its writing, acting, directing, production, score, and visual effects. The Flash has been nominated for many awards, including six BMI Film, TV & Visual Media Awards (won all), two Hollywood Post Alliance Awards, one Hugo Award, seventeen IGN Awards (winning four), eleven Kids' Choice Awards, eighteen Leo Awards (winning seven), two MTV Movie & TV Awards, five People's Choice Awards (winning one), one Primetime Emmy Award, twenty Saturn Awards (winning seven), one TCA Award, twenty-seven Teen Choice Awards (winning six), one TV Guide Award (won), and one Visual Effects Society Award. Gustin is the most decorated of the show's cast, with thirty nominations and seven wins. The show also holds the world records for "Most in-demand superhero TV show" and "Most in-demand action and adventure TV show" from the Guinness World Records.

Total awards and nominations for the cast

Awards and nominations

Notes

References

External links
 
 

The Flash (2014 TV series)
Flash